The 28th Bersaglieri Battalion "Oslavia" is an inactive battalion of the Italian Army's infantry corps' Bersaglieri speciality. Raised as XXVIII Bersaglieri Battalion in 1861 the battalion became autonomous on 20 October 1975 and received the war flag and traditions of the 9th Bersaglieri Regiment.

History

Formation 
The XXVIII Bersaglieri Battalion was raised in 1861 and part of the 6th Bersaglieri Regiment. On 1 January 1871 the 9th Bersaglieri Regiment was raised and the XXVIII battalion was transferred to it.

World War I 

During World War I the 9th Bersaglieri Regiment's IX Cyclists Battalion distinguished itself at Oslavia during the Fourth Battle of the Isonzo. The regiment and its three regular Bersaglieri battalions were disbanded on 28 November 1917 after being annihilated during the Italian retreat after the disastrous Battle of Caporetto. Regiment and XXVIII battalion were raised again on 20 February 1919 by renaming of the 20th Bersaglieri Regiment and LXX Bersaglieri Battalion.

World War II 

On 1 April 1939 the 9th Bersaglieri Regiment joined the 101st Motorized Division "Trieste", with which it participated in the Western Desert campaign in Libya. On 5 November 1942 during the Second Battle of El Alamein the regiment was surrounded and destroyed by the advancing British Eighth Army.

Cold War 
In 1963 the XXVIII Bersaglieri Battalion was raised again as mechanized infantry unit of the 31st Tank Regiment. During the 1975 army reform the 31st Tank Regiment was disbanded on 21 October 1975 and the XXVIII Bersaglieri Battalion became an autonomous unit. The battalion was renamed 28th Bersaglieri Battalion "Oslavia" and received the war flag and traditions of the 9th Bersaglieri Regiment. The battalion was based in Bellinzago Novarese and part of the 31st Armored Brigade "Curtatone", which was renamed Armored Brigade "Centauro" in 1986. On 15 October 1996 the "Oslavia" battalion was disbanded and the war flag of the 9th Bersaglieri Regiment was transferred to the Shrine of the Flags in the Vittoriano in Rome.

See also 
 Bersaglieri

References

Bersaglieri Battalions of Italy